Ramblewood Soccer Complex is a volunteer maintained sports complex consisting of eleven soccer fields, located in Charlotte, North Carolina. The complex features a 4,300-seat soccer-specific stadium, which had been home to the Charlotte Independence soccer club since 2015. The stadium was built beginning in 2014, although the complex as a whole dates back to 1993.

External links
 Ramblewood Soccer Complex
 Charlotte Independence

Charlotte Independence
Soccer venues in North Carolina
1993 establishments in North Carolina
Sports venues completed in 1993
Sports complexes in the United States